Easy Street may refer to:

Film
 Easy Street (1917 film), a Charlie Chaplin comedy
 Easy Street (1930 film), an American film by Oscar Micheaux
 Easy Street (TV series), a 1986–1987 American sitcom starring Loni Anderson and Jack Elam

Music
Easy Street (band), a 1970s British soft rock band
Easy Street, their 1976 eponymous debut album
 Easy Street (Eric Marienthal album), 1997
Easy Street, an album by Ralph Sutton with Len and Bob Barnard
Easy Street, a 2016 album by Eric Hutchinson

Songs
 "Easy Street" (Alan Rankin Jones song), a 1940 jazz standard
 "Easy Street", from the musical Annie
 "Easy Street", by Randy Newman from Harps and Angels
 "Easy Street", by Soul Asylum from And the Horse They Rode In On
 "Easy Street", by Edgar Winter from Shock Treatment, later covered by David Lee Roth
 "Easy Street", by The Collapsable Hearts Club, featured in "The Cell", an episode of The Walking Dead

Other
Easy Street, play by Nigel Williams (author)
 Easy Street (book), a memoir by Susan Berman about her mobster father, David Berman

See also
 EZ Streets, an American television drama
 Easey Street murders, in Collingwood, Victoria, Australia